Finn Peters is a flautist and saxophonist.

"After the best part of a decade immersed in dance, hip hop, Afro-Cuban, electronica and contemporary classical musics, flautist and saxophonist Finn Peters returned to his jazz roots with Su-Ling (Babel, 2006)." This was followed by Butterflies, which added "strings, a Balinese gamelan ensemble, kora, synths, a few choruses of birdsong and some inventive sound processing".

The Finn Peters Quintet (or 'Finntet') won the best jazz group category of the BBC Jazz Awards in 2007. His Music of the Mind album "explores the possibilities of music coupling regular ensemble playing to computer sounds generated by directly tapping brainwaves". He has played with Dizzee Rascal and Matthew Herbert.

Discography 
 Dr Seus EPs 1 and 2, (Mantella 2002)
 Bansuri, (Traficante, 2005)
 Suling, (Babel, 2006)
 Butterflies, (Accidental, 2008)
 Music of the Mind, (Mantella, 2010)
 Purple and Yellow, (Mantella, 2011)

References

External links
 – official site

Suling review on All About Jazz
F-IRE Collective: Finn Peters

Year of birth missing (living people)
Living people
British male saxophonists
British jazz saxophonists
Jazz flautists
People educated at Plymouth College
21st-century saxophonists
21st-century British male musicians
British male jazz musicians
The Spatial AKA Orchestra members
Alumni of Goldsmiths, University of London
21st-century flautists